Headfirst Into Everything is the third studio album by the Canadian rock band Mystery Machine.

Track listing
"YTV" - 2:30
"Gleam" - 3:41
"Wake Up Pill" - 2:37
"Doubter" - 2:51
"Doubt Is All You Know" - 2:47
"I'm Not Anything" - 3:12
"What I Want" - 2:31
"Drone" - 4:06
"Teenage Drag" - 2:24
"Fool" - 2"35
"Ditch" - 3:03
"Mad" - 3:04
"Bring You Down" - 5:36

1998 albums
Mystery Machine (band) albums